Dejazmatch Alemayehu Tewodros, often referred to as HIH Prince Alemayehu or Alamayou of Ethiopia (23 April 1861 – 14 November 1879), was the son of Emperor Tewodros II and Empress Tiruwork Wube of Ethiopia.

Biography
Alemayu's father, Emperor Tewodros II died by suicide after his defeat by the British, led by Sir Robert Napier, at the conclusion of the British Expedition to Abyssinia in 1868. After the Battle of Magdala (now referred to by its correct name, Maqdala), the young prince was taken to Britain, under the care of Captain Tristram Speedy. It is generally believed that Alamyehu was kidnapped after the British attack of his home and ransacking of the royal treasures by soldiers and others, including a staff member of the British museum. There are other versions of this history, including that this was in accordance with the wishes of Tewodros II who had asked his wife, the Empress Tiruwork Wube, in the event of his death, to place his son under the protection of the British, apparently due to the fear that the Prince's life would be in jeopardy from an aspirant for the Empire of Abyssinia. The Empress Tiruwork had intended to travel to Britain with her son following the death of her husband, but died on the march from Maqdala to Zula leaving Alemayehu an orphan. Initially, Empress Tiruwork had resisted Captain Speedy's efforts to be named the child's guardian, and had even asked the commander of the British forces, Lord Napier, to keep Speedy away from her child and herself. After the death of the Empress however, Napier allowed Speedy to assume the role of caretaker. Upon the arrival of the Prince and his chaperones in Alexandria however, Speedy dismissed the entire Ethiopian entourage of the Prince much to their distress and they returned to Ethiopia.

While staying at Speedy's home on the Isle of Wight he was introduced to Queen Victoria at her home at Osborne House. She took a great interest in his life and education. Alamayehu spent some time in India with Speedy and his wife, but the government decided he should be educated in England and he was sent to Lockers Park School and then to Cheltenham to be educated under the care of Thomas Jex-Blake, principal of Cheltenham College. He moved to Rugby School with Jex-Blake in 1875, where one of his tutors was Cyril Ransome (the future father of Arthur Ransome). In 1878 he joined the officers' training school at the Royal Military College, Sandhurst, but he was not happy there and the following year went to Far Headingley, Leeds, West Yorkshire, to stay with his old tutor Cyril Ransome. Within a week he had contracted pleurisy and died after six weeks of illness, despite the attentions of Dr Clifford Allbutt of Leeds and other respected consultants.

Queen Victoria mentioned the death of the young prince in her diary, saying what a good and kind boy he had been and how sad it was that he should die so far from his family. She also mentioned how very unhappy the prince had been, and how conscious he was of people staring at him because of his colour.

Queen Victoria arranged for Alamayehu to be buried at Windsor Castle. The funeral took place on 21 November 1879, in the presence of Cyril Ransome, Chancellor of the Exchequer Stafford Northcote, General Napier, and Captain Speedy. A brass plaque in the nave of St George's Chapel commemorates him and bears the words "I was a stranger and ye took me in", and Alamayehu's body was buried in a brick vault in the catacombs west of the chapel. Emperor Haile Selassie of Ethiopia arranged for a second plaque commemorating the Prince to be placed in the chapel as well.

In 2007, the Ethiopian government requested the return of Alemayehu's remains for reburial in Ethiopia. This request has yet to be addressed. This is also the case regarding many objects taken during the looting of Maqdala.

In popular culture
This Prince's life was the basis of the 2001 play Abyssinia that toured England in a production by Tiata Fahodzi. Written by Adewale Ajadi and directed by Femi Elufowoju Jr, it played in the Other Place in Stratford on Avon, Southwark Playhouse and other regional theatres.

Ethiopian filmmaker, Selam Bekele, reinterpreted Alamyehu's life in a short experimental film titled Prince of Nowhere. The film features an extended monologue and a closing melody by Ethiopian jazz artist, Meklit Hadero. Bekele's film screened throughout the United States in 2014 and 2015.

The story of Alemayehu's life is told in the radio play I was a stranger, by Peter Spafford, which was broadcast on BBC Radio 4 in May 2004.  The role of Alemayehu was played by Chiwetel Ejiofor.

The story of Alemayehu's life is also told in the book The Prince Who Walked With Lions by Elizabeth Laird in March 2012.

In December 2012 Alemayehu was featured in the BBC Radio 4 programme Great Lives, nominated by Ethiopian-British poet Lemn Sissay. Elizabeth Laird was the invited expert.

In May 2015 Prince Alemayehu's story was told by Sissay on an episode of  BBC Radio 4's Lemn Sissay's Homecoming.

References

Ethiopian emigrants to England
Ethiopian princes
Solomonic dynasty
1861 births
1879 deaths
Graduates of the Royal Military College, Sandhurst
Burials at St George's Chapel, Windsor Castle
Sons of emperors